The Purple Heart is a United States military decoration.

Purple Heart may also refer to:

Awards 
 Purple Heart (Ethiopia), given to military personnel wounded during a war action
 DEA Purple Heart Award, given by the U.S. Drug Enforcement Administration
 Law Enforcement Purple Heart, a generic term to describe an American law enforcement medal
 Texas Purple Heart Medal, given within the Texas Military Forces

Film 
 The Purple Heart, a 1944 American war film starring Dana Andrews
 Purple Hearts (1984 film), an American war film starring Ken Wahl and Cheryl Ladd
 Purple Heart (film), a 2006 American war film by Bill Birrell
 Purple Hearts (2022 film), an American romance film created for Netflix

Music 
 The Purple Hearts (Australian band), a 1960s R&B and rock group
 Purple Hearts (British band), a 1970s/1980s English mod revival group
 Purple Hearts (soundtrack), from the 2022 film

Plants 
 Peltogyne, genus of tropical deciduous trees, whose heartwood is sold under the name purpleheart or purple heart
 Tradescantia pallida 'Purpurea', a herbaceous cultivar with purple foliage commonly grown as an onamental perennial or houseplant

Other uses 
 Purple Heart Trail, a highway name used in the United States
 Purple Heart, a novel by Patricia McCormick
 Purple Heart, a main character in the Hyperdimension Neptunia video game series
 Purple Heart Memorial Bridge, in the Alexandria, Louisiana area
 Dexamyl or "purple hearts", an obsolete antidepressant used as a recreational drug